Tim Clancy (born 8 June 1984) is an Irish football manager of League of Ireland Premier Division club St Patrick's Athletic, having previously managed Drogheda United. During his playing career, Clancy played for Millwall, Weymouth, AFC Hornchurch, Fisher Athletic, Kilmarnock, Motherwell, Hibernian, St Johnstone, Shamrock Rovers, Sligo Rovers and Bray Wanderers.

Playing career

Early career
Clancy played for the Republic of Ireland under-19 team. He played for his home town club Trim Celtic and then Belvedere before signing for Millwall. He then had spells in English non-league football with Weymouth, AFC Hornchurch and Fisher Athletic.

Kilmarnock

Clancy joined Scottish Premier League club Kilmarnock in early 2007 on amateur forms. He then agreed a one-year professional contract with Kilmarnock in June 2007. Clancy made his debut at left full back away to Gretna in September and made enough appearances during the 2007–08 season to trigger an automatic extension to his contract. His progress at Kilmarnock was hindered by a series of injuries, however, as he missed over four months after suffering an ankle ligament injury in April 2008.

Clancy also missed pre-season training in 2008–09 due to injury. He made a first team comeback in a goalless 0–0 draw at Aberdeen in February 2009. Clancy played regularly for Kilmarnock towards the end of the season and agreed a new two-year contract with the club. He did not play regularly during the 2010–11 season, as manager Mixu Paatelainen used Jamie Hamill as his regular right back. Later in the season, he scored an own goal which gave Rangers a 2–1 victory. Clancy made 73 appearances for Killie in total. Manager Kenny Shiels allowed Clancy to leave the club in order to rebalance his defensive options, with Ryan O'Leary out injured.

Motherwell
Clancy moved to Motherwell in August 2011 and agreed a one-year deal. Motherwell signed Clancy to cover for the long-term injury suffered by Steven Saunders. He played regularly in central defence for Mothewell, alongside Shaun Hutchinson. He also played both full back positions during the season. At the end of the season, Clancy rejected a new contract from Motherwell.

Hibernian
Clancy signed a two-year contract with Hibernian in June 2012. Clancy scored the first goal in a 2–2 draw against Celtic on 1 September, when he took advantage of a defensive mix-up. It was the first goal he had scored since playing in English non-league football, over six years previously. Clancy played regularly for Hibs before suffering from a groin injury that required specialist advice. He continued to suffer from injury problems and was released by Hibs in January 2014.

St Johnstone
On 28 February 2014, Clancy signed for St Johnstone on a contract until the end of the 2013–14 season despite interests from Derry City. Clancy scored his first goal for the club, in a 3–3 draw against Celtic on 7 May 2014, which turns out to be his last appearance for the club. Clancy sustained a serious Achilles injury during training and needed an operation that ruled him out of the final of the Scottish Cup. At the end of the 2013–14 season, Clancy was among four players to be released by St Johnstone.

League of Ireland
Clancy returned home to sign for Shamrock Rovers in February 2015. In July 2015 Clancy went on loan to Sligo Rovers until November 2015. In January 2016 he signed permanently for Sligo but left the club in June 2016. On 28 June 2016 he went on trial at Bray Wanderers during their 1-0 friendly win against Falkirk. On 30 June 2016 Clancy signed permanently for Bray making his competitive debut against Bohemians. He retired from playing at the end of the 2017 season.

Managerial Career

Drogheda United
On 5 December 2017 Clancy was appointed as Manager of League of Ireland First Division side Drogheda United. This was his first role in management, and he was assisted in the role by newly appointed Director of Football Dave Robertson. During his first two seasons at the club, his young Drogheda side missed out on promotion twice. Ahead of the 2020 season, Clancy added more key members to his squad, and the club lifted the 2020 League of Ireland First Division Title, gaining promotion to the League of Ireland Premier Division. This was his first honour at the club. 

In his first season in the Premier Division with Drogheda, Clancy guided the Drogs to seventh place, securing top flight football for another season for the Louth club. Despite having one of the lowest budgets in the league, Clancy led the club to impressive victories against St Patrick's Athletic, Derry City and rivals Dundalk.

St Patrick's Athletic
On 2 December 2021, it was announced that St Patrick's Athletic had met the release clause in Clancy's Drogheda United contract and had joined the club on a 2 year contract effective immediately. With Kevin Doherty staying at Drogheda to become first team manager, former Dundee United striker Jon Daly was appointed as Clancy's assistant manager. Clancy had to deal with the losses of Robbie Benson, John Mountney and Sam Bone who followed former head coach Stephen O'Donnell to Dundalk, while also losing other key players such as Lee Desmond, Alfie Lewis, Matty Smith and Vítězslav Jaroš. In terms of incomings, Clancy signed Joe Redmond, Mark Doyle and David Odumosu who he had worked with previously at Drogheda United, along with former Hibernian teammate Eoin Doyle and Joseph Anang, Jack Scott, Tom Grivosti, Anthony Breslin, Tunde Owolabi and Adam O'Reilly. 

Clancy's first league game as manager of the Saints was a comfortable 3–0 away win over Shelbourne in what was their manager Damien Duff's first game in senior management.

His first taste of managing in European football was in Pat's UEFA Europa Conference League campaign, which started out with a 1–1 draw at home to Slovenian side NŠ Mura. The second leg saw his side advance 6–5 on penalties following a 0–0 draw after extra time. The next round saw Pat's beat Bulgarian side CSKA Sofia 1–0 away before suffering the heartache of a 2–0 loss in the second leg following a controversial late penalty. Clancy's side finished in 4th place at the end of his first season in charge, securing UEFA Europa Conference League football for 2023.

Clancy was awarded his UEFA Pro Licence in December 2022, the highest coaching qualification in world football.

Career statistics

Playing career
Professional appearances in playing career.

Managerial career
Competitive games only – correct as of 17 March 2023.

Honours

As Manager
Drogheda United
League of Ireland First Division (1): 2020

References

External links

Kilmarnock FC profile

1984 births
Living people
Millwall F.C. players
Kilmarnock F.C. players
Motherwell F.C. players
Republic of Ireland association footballers
Scottish Premier League players
Expatriate footballers in Scotland
Fisher Athletic F.C. players
Hornchurch F.C. players
Weymouth F.C. players
Walton & Hersham F.C. players
National League (English football) players
Isthmian League players
People from County Meath
Association football defenders
Hibernian F.C. players
St Johnstone F.C. players
Shamrock Rovers F.C. players
Sligo Rovers F.C. players
Bray Wanderers F.C. players
Irish expatriate sportspeople in Scotland
Irish expatriate sportspeople in England
Expatriate footballers in England
Scottish Professional Football League players
Belvedere F.C. players
League of Ireland players
League of Ireland managers
Drogheda United F.C. managers
St Patrick's Athletic F.C. managers